The women's javelin throw competition of the athletics events at the 2019 Pan American Games took place on 9 August at the 2019 Pan American Games Athletics Stadium. The defending Pan American Games champion was Elizabeth Gleadle from Canada.

Records
Prior to this competition, the existing world and Pan American Games records were as follows:

Schedule

Results
All times shown are in meters.

Final
The final took place on 9 August at 15:05. The results were as follows:

References

Athletics at the 2019 Pan American Games
2019